Lapa is a former parish (freguesia) in the municipality of Lisbon, Portugal. It has a total area of 0.72 km2 and total population of 8,671 inhabitants (2001); density: 12,026.4 inhabitants/km2. At the administrative reorganization of Lisbon on 8 December 2012 it became part of the parish Estrela.

It was created on February 11, 1770, by the Cardinal patriarch of Lisbon Francisco de Saldanha da Gama.

This parish of Lisbon concentrates a large number of embassies of foreign countries in Portugal, in particular, Austria, Bulgaria, Canada, China, Finland, Indonesia, Ireland, Luxembourg, Sovereign Military Order of Malta, Netherlands, Romania, Sweden, Switzerland and United Kingdom.

It is also the site of the Assembly of the Republic and the official residence of the prime minister of Portugal.

Main sites
São Bento Palace
Estrela Basilica

External links

 Lapa's parish website

References 

Former parishes of Lisbon